Melitaea asteria, the little fritillary, is a butterfly in the family Nymphalidae. It is found in the Alps of Europe.

The larva feeds on Plantago alpina.

References

External links
Leps It

Melitaea
Butterflies of Europe
Butterflies described in 1828